Criticism of communism may refer to:
 Criticism of communist party rule, which is criticism of the practical policies implemented by 20th century governments claiming to follow the ideology of Marxism–Leninism (usually known as communist states)
 Criticism of Marxism, which is criticism of the political ideology and principles most often identified with the word communism